Paul Fox may refer to:

 Paul S. Fox (1898–1972), American set decorator
 Sir Paul Fox (television executive) (born 1925), British television executive
 Paul Fox (musician) (1951–2007), British singer and guitarist
 Paul Fox (record producer) (1954–2022), American record producer
 Paul Fox, British ambassador to Hungary
 Paul Fox (actor) (born 1979), British actor